The cucumber beetle (Acalymma albidovittatum) is a beetle of the family Chrysomelidae and a serious pest of cucurbit crops in subtropical and tropical South America; Argentina, Bolivia and Brazil.

References

Galerucinae
Beetles of South America
Arthropods of Argentina
Invertebrates of Bolivia
Insects of Brazil
Beetles described in 1889
Taxa named by Joseph Sugar Baly
Agricultural pest insects